Amira Ben Chaabane  (born 29 May 1990) is a Tunisian sabre fencer; gold medallist at the 2010 African Fencing Championships. She qualified to the individual event of the 2012 Summer Olympics as one of the best top-ranked fencers of the African zone.  She was defeated 15-12 in the first round by Chen Xiaodong of China.  In 2019, she won the African Fencing Championships again.

She competed at the 2020 Summer Olympics.

References

External links

Tunisian female sabre fencers
Living people
Olympic fencers of Tunisia
Fencers at the 2012 Summer Olympics
Sportspeople from Tunis
1990 births
Fencers at the 2020 Summer Olympics
21st-century Tunisian women